David Preiss FRS (born January 21, 1947) is a Czech and British mathematician, specializing in mathematical analysis. 
He is a professor of mathematics at the University of Warwick 

Preiss is a recipient of the Ostrowski Prize (2011)
and the winner of the 2008 London Mathematical Society Pólya Prize for his 1987 result on Geometry of Measures, where he solved the remaining problem in the geometric theoretic structure of sets and measures in Euclidean space.
He was an invited speaker at the ICM 1990 in Kyoto. 
He is a Fellow of the Royal Society (2004) and a Foreign Fellow of the Learned Society of the Czech Republic (2003).

He is associate editor of the mathematical journal Real Analysis Exchange.

Publications

References

External links
 David Preiss webpage at University of Warwick

1947 births
Living people
English mathematicians
Academics of the University of Warwick
Fellows of the Royal Society
Measure theorists
Functional analysts